The Ryukyu Kajika frog, Japanese Buerger's frog, or Japanese stream treefrog (Buergeria japonica) is a species of frog in the family Rhacophoridae. It is found in the Ryukyu Islands (Japan) and in Taiwan.

Habitat
Buergeria japonica is a common species that occurs in a wide variety of habitats (rivers, intermittent rivers, freshwater marshes, intermittent freshwater marshes, freshwater springs, geothermal wetlands, irrigated land, and canals and ditches).
It is locally threatened by habitat loss.

Description
Buergeria japonica is a small to medium-sized frog, about  snout-vent length in males.

Reproduction
Buergeria japonica normally breed in slow-moving water in ditches and small streams. However, some Taiwanese populations also breed in geothermal hot springs. In this habitat, frogs can breed throughout the year. Another advantage is that high temperature facilitates growth; furthermore, competition may be reduced in this unusual habitat.

References

Buergeria
Amphibians of Japan
Amphibians of Taiwan
Amphibians described in 1861
Taxa named by Edward Hallowell (herpetologist)
Taxonomy articles created by Polbot